The Pittsburgh Senior Classic was a golf tournament on the Champions Tour from 1993 to 1998. It was played in the greater Pittsburgh, Pennsylvania area; first in Midway, Pennsylvania at the Quicksilver Golf Club (1993-1997) and then in Sewickley Heights, Pennsylvania at the Sewickley Heights Golf Club.

The purse for the 1998 tournament was US$1,100,000, with $165,000 going to the winner. The tournament was founded in 1993 as the Quicksilver Classic.

Winners
Pittsburgh Senior Classic
1998 Larry Nelson
1997 Hugh Baiocchi
1996 Tom Weiskopf

Quicksilver Classic
1995 Dave Stockton
1994 Dave Eichelberger
1993 Bob Charles

Source:

References

Former PGA Tour Champions events
Golf in Pittsburgh